Market and 1st Street (eastbound) and Market and Battery (westbound) stations are a pair of light rail stations in San Francisco, California, United States, serving the San Francisco Municipal Railway F Market & Wharves heritage railway line. They are located on Market Street at the intersections of 1st Street and Battery Street. The low-level platforms are also utilized by several bus and trolleybus routes.

Under the planned Better Market Street project, the outbound F stop would be discontinued to reduce travel times.

References

San Francisco Municipal Railway streetcar stations